Cecilia of Brandenburg ( – 4 January 1449) was a princess of Brandenburg by birth and by marriage a Duchess of Brunswick-Wolfenbüttel.

Life 
Cecilia was the daughter of Elector Frederick I of Brandenburg (1371–1440) from his marriage to Elizabeth (1383–1442), daughter of Duke Frederick of Bavaria-Landshut.  Cecilia's brothers were the reigning Electors of Brandenburg, first Frederick II and later Albrecht III Achilles.

She married on 30 May 1423 in Berlin Duke William III of Brunswick-Lüneburg (1392–1482). The marriage had been arranged by Emperor Sigsmund, like that of her sister Magdalena with Duke Frederick II of Brunswick-Lüneburg.  Both couples had been engaged on 3 March 1420.

William and his brother Henry II had promised Cecila as jointure Bodenteich Castle plus an annual pensionof 2000 guilders.  After an exchange of territories, Cecilia received Wolfenbüttel Castle instead.  Bishop Magnus of Saxe-Lauenburg tried to redeem pledges to Duke Henry II, and in particular Wolfenbüttel Castle.  To avoid the claims of the bishop, Cecilia handed the castle to her brother-in-law Henry II in 1432.  Henry managed to avert the claims of the bishop.  However, he then asked Cecilia and her children to leave his castle.  Cecilia was quoted as saying: this is not what your brother had in mind, and is behaviour unbecoming a Lord of Brunswick, even if I'd been only the wife of a lowly subject.  Humiliated, Cecilia and her children moved to Schöningen Castle.  A dispute then erupted between Henry and William.  The dispute was settled by dividing the Duchy of Brunswick.  Henry received Brunswick-Wolfenbüttel, while William had to make do with the Principality of Calenberg.

Cecilia died on 4 January 1449 and was buried in Brunswick Cathedral

Issue 
From her marriage with William, Cecilia had two sons:
 Frederick III "the Restless" (1424–1495), Duke of Brunswick-Calenberg
 married firstly in 1463 Princess Anna of Brunswick-Grubenhagen (1415–1474)
 married secondly 1483 Margaret Countess of Rietberg (died: 1533 or 1535)
 William IV "the Younger" (1425–1503), Duke of Brunswick-Wolfenbüttel
 married in 1444 Countess Elisabeth of Stolberg-Wernigerode (died: 1520 or 1521)

References and sources 
 Wilhelm Havemann: Geschichte der Lande Braunschweig und Lüneburg, Dieterich, 1853, pp. 667 ff.

Footnotes 

House of Hohenzollern
1405 births
1449 deaths
Duchesses of Brunswick-Wolfenbüttel
15th-century German people
Middle House of Brunswick
Burials at Brunswick Cathedral
Daughters of monarchs